William Mark Atkins (born 9 May 1939 in Solihull) is an English former professional footballer who played as a forward in the Football League in the 1960s and 1970s.

He made league appearances for six different clubs, including two spells and 200 appearances with Halifax Town. His first spell with Halifax ended in March 1967 when he moved to Stockport County in a swap-deal with David Shawcross.

References

1939 births
Association football forwards
English Football League players
Swindon Town F.C. players
Halifax Town A.F.C. players
Stockport County F.C. players
Portsmouth F.C. players
Rochdale A.F.C. players
Darlington F.C. players
Living people
Sportspeople from Solihull
English footballers